The Armenian National Rowing and Canoe Federation, is the regulating body of rowing, canoeing and kayaking in Armenia. The headquarters of the federation is located in Yerevan.

History
The president of the Federation is Vahan Adamyan. The Federation is a member of the International Canoe Federation, the European Canoe Association, and the World Rowing Federation.

See also
 Sport in Armenia

References

External links 
 Armenian National Rowing and Canoe Federation on Facebook

	
Sports governing bodies in Armenia
National members of the European Canoe Association
National members of the World Rowing Federation